Sheldon Township is one of twenty-six townships in Iroquois County, Illinois, USA.  As of the 2010 census, its population was 1,374 and it contained 613 housing units.  Sheldon Township was formed from Concord Township on February 19, 1868.

Geography

Cities, towns, villages
 Sheldon

Unincorporated towns
 Darrow at 
 Eastburn at 
 Effner at 
 Webster at 
(This list is based on USGS data and may include former settlements.)

Cemeteries
The township contains Sheldon Cemetery.

Major highways
  U.S. Route 24

Airports and landing strips
 Disosway Airport

Demographics

Political districts
 Illinois' 15th congressional district
 State House District 105
 State Senate District 53

References

 
 United States Census Bureau 2007 TIGER/Line Shapefiles
 United States National Atlas

External links
 City-Data.com
 Illinois State Archives

Townships in Iroquois County, Illinois
Townships in Illinois